The purplemouth moray eel Gymnothorax vicinus, is a moray eel found in the Atlantic Ocean. It was first named by Francis de Laporte de Castelnau in 1855.

References

External links
 

purplemouth moray
Fish of the Atlantic Ocean
purplemouth moray